The 1974–75 SM-sarja season was the 44th and last season of the SM-sarja, the top level of ice hockey in Finland. The SM-liiga became the new top level league in 1975-76. 10 teams participated in the league, and Tappara Tampere won the championship.

Regular season

External links
 Season on hockeyarchives.info

1974–75 in Finnish ice hockey
Fin
Liiga seasons